Psychopathic: The Videos is a DVD collection of remastered music videos released by Psychopathic Video. The film features videos by the artists Insane Clown Posse, Twiztid, Boondox, Blaze Ya Dead Homie, Esham, Axe Murder Boyz, Anybody Killa, and Psychopathic Rydas.

Content 
The collection contains a variety of uncensored, partially censored, and clean versions of music videos. Each video features an intro from a different Psychopathic artist. The video features remastered music videos released by Psychopathic Records from the label's inception up to 2007. Each video is given an introduction by a different artist on the label. In addition to the 23 listed music videos, the collection includes two hidden music videos. The only videos not released were the three Professional wrestling highlight videos released by Juggalo Championship Wrestling featuring the songs "Down With The Clown" by Insane Clown Posse and "I Don't Care" by Dark Lotus.

Track listing

References

External links
 

2007 video albums
Hip hop video albums
Psychopathic Video films
Video albums by American artists